Moon Ji-hoo (born April 29, 1991) is a South Korean actor, singer and model. He is best known for his main role in I Have Three Boyfriends. He is a former member of boy group A-Jax.

Discography

Filmography

Television series

Film

Web series

References

External links 
 
 
 

1991 births
Living people
DSP Media artists
21st-century South Korean male actors
South Korean male models
South Korean male idols
South Korean male singers
South Korean pop singers
South Korean male television actors
South Korean male film actors